Mirsad Bektić (born February 16, 1991) is a Bosnian-born American retired professional mixed martial artist who competed in the Featherweight division of the Ultimate Fighting Championship (UFC)

Background

Mirsad Bektić was born on February 16, 1991, to Bosnian Muslim parents in the eastern Bosnian town of Srebrenica in the Socialist Federal Republic of Yugoslavia (present-day Bosnia and Herzegovina) amid the breakup of Yugoslavia. At the age of three, he relocated to Italy with his mother Suada and his siblings fleeing the Bosnian War, a conflict which claimed the lives of his maternal grandparents and several relatives. The family moved again for a five-year stay in Germany. Bektić moved to the United States at age nine, where his family settled in Lincoln, Nebraska. He has two older brothers and a younger sister. Bektić went to Irving Middle School, and graduated from Lincoln Southeast High School. He began training in karate at the age of 13 and later boxed for one and a half years before transitioning to mixed martial arts in 2008.

Mixed martial arts career

Early career
Bektić made his professional debut in 2011, competing primarily in regional promotions across the Central United States where he compiled an undefeated record of 7–0 before signing with the UFC in early 2014.  Prior to being signed by the UFC, Bektić was touted by notable publication BloodyElbow.com who listed Bektić at #1 in its "MMA's Top 25 Prospects" list in 2014.

Ultimate Fighting Championship 
Bektić made his promotional debut against fellow newcomer Chas Skelly on April 19, 2014, at UFC on Fox 11.  Bektić won the back and forth fight via majority decision.  The fight was nearly stopped in the second round as Skelly landed a pair of illegal knees as Bektić was grounded against the cage, prompting the referee to deduct a point and allow him five minutes to recover. Bektić clearly was hurt and wobbled as he returned to his feet but was able to continue after a brief break.

Bektić was expected to face Ernest Chavez on August 23, 2014, at UFC Fight Night 49.  However, Chavez was forced out of the bout with an injury and was replaced by Max Holloway.  In turn, Bektić pulled out of the bout in the week leading up to the event and was replaced by promotional newcomer Clay Collard.

Bektić was expected to face Alan Omer on January 24, 2015, at UFC on Fox 14. However, Omer pulled out of the fight with an undisclosed injury and replaced by promotional newcomer Paul Redmond.  Bektić won the one-sided fight via unanimous decision.

Bektić was expected to face Renato Moicano on May 30, 2015, at UFC Fight Night 67.  However, Moicano pulled out of the fight in late April and was replaced by Lucas Martins.  Bektić won the fight via TKO in the second round.

Bektić was expected to face Tatsuya Kawajiri on December 11, 2015, at The Ultimate Fighter 22 Finale. However, Bektić pulled out of the fight on November 27 citing injury.

Bektić was expected to face Arnold Allen on October 8, 2016, at UFC 204. However, Allen pulled out of the fight citing injury and was replaced by Russell Doane. He won the fight via submission in the first round.

Bektić faced Darren Elkins on March 4, 2017, at UFC 209. Despite completely dominating the first two rounds, he lost the fight by knockout due to punches and a head kick.

Bektić faced Godofredo Pepey on January 27, 2018, at UFC on Fox 27. He won the fight in the first round via body punch. This win earned him a Performance of the Night bonus.

Bektić faced Ricardo Lamas on June 9, 2018, at UFC 225. He won the fight by split decision.

Bektić was scheduled to face Renato Moicano on December 8, 2018, at UFC 231, however on November 15, 2018, it was reported that Bektić was forced to pull out of the bout due to an undisclosed injury. 

Bektić faced Josh Emmett on July 13, 2019, at UFC Fight Night 155. He lost the fight via technical knockout in round one.

Bektić faced Dan Ige on February 8, 2020, at UFC 247. He lost the fight via a split decision.

Bektić was scheduled to face Luiz Eduardo Garagorri on September 26, 2020, at UFC Fight Night 178. However on September 15, Garagorri was pulled from the fight after testing positive for COVID-19.Returning veteran Damon Jackson would step up to face Bektić. He lost the fight via a submission in round three.

On July 13, 2021, Bektić announced his retirement from MMA.

Championships and accomplishments

Mixed martial arts
Ultimate Fighting Championship
Performance of the Night (One time)  vs. Godofredo Pepey

Mixed martial arts record

|Loss
|align=center|13–4
|Damon Jackson
|Submission (guillotine choke)
|UFC Fight Night: Covington vs. Woodley 
|
|align=center|3
|align=center|1:21
|Las Vegas, Nevada, United States
|
|-
|Loss
|align=center|13–3
|Dan Ige
|Decision (split)
|UFC 247 
|
|align=center|3
|align=center|5:00
|Houston, Texas, United States
|
|-
|Loss
|align=center|13–2
|Josh Emmett
|TKO (punches)
|UFC Fight Night: de Randamie vs. Ladd 
|
|align=center|1
|align=center|4:25
|Sacramento, California, United States
|
|-
|Win
|align=center|13–1
|Ricardo Lamas
|Decision (split)
|UFC 225 
|
|align=center|3
|align=center|5:00
|Chicago, Illinois, United States
|
|-
|Win
|align=center|12–1
|Godofredo Pepey
|TKO (punch to the body)
|UFC on Fox: Jacaré vs. Brunson 2 
|
|align=center|1
|align=center|2:47
|Charlotte, North Carolina, United States
|
|-
|Loss
|align=center|11–1
|Darren Elkins
|KO (punches) 
|UFC 209
|
|align=center|3
|align=center|3:19
|Las Vegas, Nevada, United States
|
|-
|Win
|align=center|11–0
|Russell Doane
|Submission (rear-naked choke)
|UFC 204
|
|align=center|1
|align=center|4:22
|Manchester, England
|
|-
| Win
|align=center| 10–0
|Lucas Martins
| TKO (punches)
|UFC Fight Night: Condit vs. Alves
|
|align=center|2
|align=center|0:30
|Goiânia, Brazil
|
|-
| Win
|align=center| 9–0
|Paul Redmond
| Decision (unanimous)
|UFC on Fox: Gustafsson vs. Johnson
|
|align=center|3
|align=center|5:00
|Stockholm, Sweden
|
|-
| Win
|align=center| 8–0
|Chas Skelly
| Decision (majority)
|UFC on Fox: Werdum vs. Browne
|
|align=center|3
|align=center|5:00
|Orlando, Florida, United States
|
|-
| Win
|align=center| 7–0
|Joe Pearson
| TKO (punches) 
|VFC 41
|
|align=center|1
|align=center|1:32
|Ralston, Nebraska, United States
|
|-
| Win
|align=center| 6–0
|Nick Macias
| TKO (punches)
|RFA 7: Thatch vs. Rhodes
|
|align=center|1
|align=center|1:57
|Broomfield, Colorado, United States
|
|-
| Win
|align=center| 5–0
|Doug Jenkins
| Decision (unanimous)
|RFA 5: Downing vs. Rinaldi
|
|align=center|3
|align=center|5:00
|Kearney, Nebraska, United States
|
|-
| Win
|align=center| 4–0
|Willie Mack
| TKO (punches)
||Titan FC 22
|
|align=center|2
|align=center|0:27
|Kansas City, Kansas, United States
|
|-
| Win
|align=center| 3–0
|Cody Carrillo
| Submission (rear-naked choke)
||Titan FC 21
|
|align=center|3
|align=center|3:12
|Kansas City, Kansas, United States
|
|-
| Win
|align=center| 2–0
|Derek Rhoads
| TKO (punches)
|VFC 36
|
|align=center|1
|align=center|1:31
|Council Bluffs, Iowa, United States
|
|-
| Win
|align=center| 1–0
|Shane Hutchinson
| Submission (punches)
|VFC 35
|
|align=center|1
|align=center|0:31
|Council Bluffs, Iowa, United States
|
|-

Amateur mixed martial arts record

|-
| Win
|align=center| 4–0
|Mac Bailey
|TKO (punches)
|Titan FC 16
|
|align=center|3
|align=center|1:17
||Kansas City, Kansas, United States
|
|-
| Win
|align=center| 3–0
|Chad Zurfluh
|Submission (punches)
|VFC 31
|
|align=center|1
|align=center|1:28
||Council Bluffs, Iowa, United States
| 
|-
| Win
|align=center| 2–0
|Jason Russell
|TKO (punches)
|VFC 30
|
|align=center|1
|align=center|2:06
|Council Bluffs, Iowa, United States
| 
|-
| Win
|align=center| 1–0
|Zac Chavez
|TKO (punches)
|Featherweight Grand Prix Final Round
|
|align=center|2
|align=center|2:03
|Denver, Colorado, United States
|

See also
 List of male mixed martial artists

References

External links
 
 

Living people
1991 births
American male mixed martial artists
Mixed martial artists from Nebraska
Bosnia and Herzegovina male mixed martial artists
Mixed martial artists utilizing karate
Mixed martial artists utilizing boxing
Mixed martial artists utilizing freestyle wrestling
Bosnia and Herzegovina emigrants to the United States
American people of Bosniak descent
People from Coconut Creek, Florida
Ultimate Fighting Championship male fighters